Kaletinac is a village situated in Gadžin Han municipality in Serbia.

Memorial House of Dragutin Matić 

Kaletinac is the birthplace of Dragutin Matić (1888–1970), a famous Serbian infantry soldier from World War I. His image is widely recognizable in Serbia, from a photograph where he was a lookout of Austro-Hungarian positions. That photograph is often found in military albums, encyclopedias and museums. The house was built by his father Peša, and mother Nevena Matić, shortly before his birth in 1888. The house never changed its appearance since. Nicknamed Hawkeye, Matić was the youngest of 7 children, and gre up in the house.

Matić lived in the house with his family, until he died in 1970. In the mid-2000s the initiative was started for his birth house in Kaletinac to be adapted into the museum. The house was abandoned and derelict as all the descendants of the Matić family moved out and some emigrated abroad. In July 2018 it was announced that the house will be reconstructed and turned into the memorial home. Both living descendants waved their rights on the house and donated it to the municipality to turn it into the museum. Reconstruction is scheduled to start in the fall of 2018.

The reconstruction was postponed and by 2021 the surveys showed that reconstruction was impossible. The roof completely collapsed, few remaining walls cracked with only the basement remaining intact. The ruins became decayed and prone to collapse. It was decided to demolish the ruins and to fully rebuild the house in authentic style of the ruined house, the typical style of the village, folk house from the 19th century. It will have the same appearance and will be made of the same materials, stone, wood and earth. Works began in June 2021. The finished house will be adapted into the heritage museum, which would also exhibit artifacts found during the demolition. The souvenir shop will be built next to the house. The venue was opened on 24 June 2022, as both the Memorial House of Dragutin Matić, and the Heritage Museum of Zaplanje.

There is a modest memorial on the local cemetery, where Matić was buried. Commemorating 100th anniversary of the war, Milovan Vitezović published a poem "All-seeing eye" about Matić in 2014, while sculptor Mirko Mrkić Ostroški sculptured a bronze relief of Matić, which was placed as a memorial plaque on the façade of the Military Club of Serbia. A monument to Matić was erected in Gadžin Han, Kaletinac's municipal seat.

References 

Populated places in Nišava District